Bernard La Jarrige (25 February 1912 – 29 May 1999) was a French film and television actor. His name is sometimes written as Bernard Lajarrige.

Selected filmography

 Orage (1938) - Un copain (uncredited)
 La cité des lumières (1938)
 The Emigrant (1940) - Le journaliste (uncredited)
 La loi du printemps (1942)
 Patricia (1942) - Le gars du village
 L'auberge de l'abîme (1943)
 Fou d'amour (1943) - Le spectateur
 Angels of Sin (1943) - Un gardien de la prison
 The Angel of the Night (1944) - (uncredited)
 The Woman Who Dared (1944) - Le mécano (uncredited)
 Les Dames du Bois de Boulogne (1945)
 Lessons in Conduct (1946) - Roland
 Man About Town (1947) - Paulo
 Amours, délices et orgues (1947) - Martin
 Carré de valets (1947) - Albert Furet - un cambrioleur
 Emile the African (1948) - Daniel Cormier
 Three Boys, One Girl (1948) - Michel Dourville
 Mission in Tangier (1949) - P'tit Louis
 Rendezvous in July (1949) - Guillaume Rousseau
 The Chocolate Girl (1949) - Raoul Pinglet - le chauffeur
 Millionaires for One Day (1949) - Philippe Dubreuil - un journaliste
 Not Any Weekend for Our Love (1950) - Christian, frère de Franck
 Au p'tit zouave (1950) - Louis
 Casimir (1950) - Paul-André - un peintre
 Beware of Blondes (1950) - Petit Louis
 Le plus joli péché du monde (1951) - Bébert / Albert Pignol
 The Cape of Hope (1951) - Raymond
 My Wife Is Formidable (1951) - Le joueur de belote (uncredited)
 Massacre in Lace (1952) - P'tit Louis
 Monsieur Leguignon, Signalman (1952) - Maître Follenfant - un avocat
 Beauties of the Night (1952) - Léon - le gendarme
 Les détectives du dimanche (1953) - Laurent
 Women of Paris (1953) - Inspecteur Corbin
 Nuits andalouses (1954) - Gaston
 Oh No, Mam'zelle (1954) - Loriot
 Felices Pascuas (1954) - Juan
 Les chiffonniers d'Emmaüs (1955) - Philippe, le légionnaire
 Caroline and the Rebels (1955) - Lavaux, l'ordonnance de Juan
 Les nuits de Montmartre (1955) - L'inspecteur Bailly
 Thirteen at the Table (1955) - Raphaël
 La Traversée de Paris (1956) - Un agent de police
 Ah, quelle équipe! (1957) - Louis Sévrier
 Élisa (1957) - M. Granier
 Une nuit aux Baléares (1957) - Dysian Mekanovitch
 Les Espions (1957) - Le garçon de café
 Échec au porteur (1958) - L'inspecteur Le Crocq
 Le insaziabili (1958) - L'impresario
 Archimède le clochard (1959) - Un poissonnier
 Le secret du Chevalier d'Éon (1959) - Pascal d'Éon de Beaumont
 Marie of the Isles (1959) - Petit rôle (uncredited)
 Nathalie, agent secret (1959)
 The Cat Shows Her Claws (1960) - Dalmier dit Athos
 Pantalaskas (1960) - Félix Clergeon
 Une fille pour l'été (1960) - Le barman
 Quai du Point-du-Jour (1960) - Robert Flic
 Murder at 45 R.P.M. (1960) - Moureu
 Il suffit d'aimer (1961) - François Soubirous
 Captain Fracasse (1961) - Le serviteur du baron de Sigognac (uncredited)
 Karolina Rijecka (1961)
 Sherlock Holmes and the Deadly Necklace (1962) - Inspector French
 The Bread Peddler (1963) - Le préfet de police
 Requiem pour un caïd (1964) - Inspecteur Lenoir
 The Train (1964) - Bernard - Doctor (uncredited)
 The Counterfeit Constable (1964) - Un supporter français
 Angélique, Marquise des Anges (1964) - Le baron de Monteloup
 The Two Orphans (1965) - Rumagnac
 Pleins feux sur Stanislas (1965) - Paul
 The Exterminators (1965) - Bruno Schwartz
 Trap for the Assassin (1966) - Bernadit (uncredited)
 Les Créatures (1966) - Doctor Desteau
 Mayerling (1968) - Loschek
 Les patates (1969) - Le maire de Bourg-Fidèle
 Darling Lili (1970) - French Pilot Singing 'La Marseillaise' (uncredited)
 Les stances à Sophie (1971) - M. Aignan
 The Bar at the Crossing (1972) - Nicky Holly
 Le droit d'aimer (1972)
 Five Leaf Clover (1972)
 L'affaire Crazy Capo (1973)
 À nous quatre, Cardinal ! (1974) - Un aubergiste de Bauvais
 Let Joy Reign Supreme (1975) - Amaury de Lambilly
 Le bougnoul (1975) - Rémy Cortin - le patron du bistrot
 On a retrouvé la septième compagnie (1975) - L'artificier
 Madame Rosa (1977) - Louis Charmette - un retraité SNCF
 Le Crabe-tambour (1977) - Le recteur
 Violette Nozière (1978) - Monsieur de Pinguet (uncredited)
 From Hell to Victory (1979) - (uncredited)
 Bloodline (1979) - Butler
 La puce et le privé (1981) - Le vieux compagnon du colonel
 Le cowboy (1985) - Alphonse
 Le radeau de la Méduse (1990) - Bonnefoux
 Le Roi de Paris (1995) - Champmartin (final film role)

References

Bibliography 
 Ann C. Paietta. Saints, Clergy and Other Religious Figures on Film and Television, 1895–2003. McFarland, 2005.

External links 
 

1912 births
1999 deaths
French male film actors